Benge is a village in the Bas-Uélé province of the Democratic Republic of the Congo. It was a station on the defunct Vicicongo line, a railway.

Location

Benge is in the Bas-Uélé province, Democratic Republic of the Congo.
It is in extreme east of Buta Territory.
It is in the  chiefdom of Monganzulu.
A road leads east from the village to Zobia in Bambesa Territory.

Colonial period

During the colonial period Benge was a chiefdom of the Mondingima tribe in the Zobia Territory.
The main axis of the Vicicongo line built by the Société des Chemins de Fer Vicinaux du Congo ran east from ran from Andoma through Benge to Zobia.
This section was opened in December 1932.

Notes

Sources

Populated places in Bas-Uélé